National Tertiary Route 713, or just Route 713 (or ) is a National Road Route of Costa Rica, located in the Alajuela province.

Description
In Alajuela province the route covers San Ramón canton (San Rafael district), San Mateo canton (Desmonte district), Atenas canton (Jesús district), Palmares canton (Zaragoza, Santiago districts).

References

Highways in Costa Rica